is a former Japanese singer and actress who is noted for singing Platonic Tsuranuite, the first ending of Ranma ½. Also in Kiteretsu Daihyakka, she sang "Race no Cardigan" for the ending theme in the first season. In 1991, she portrayed Ai Amano in the live-action version of the popular manga series Video Girl Ai. She also portrays Deputy Captain Shinobu Mizuki in Ultraman Cosmos. She retired from the music industry at 15 years old. In 1993, she was in Japanese Playboy at the age of 19.

Works 
 Platonic Tsuranuite (Let's Keep It Platonic)
 Race no Cardigan (Lace Cardigan)
 Good-bye My Love
 Boyfriend
 Privacy
 Summer Kiss

Filmography

External links 
 

1974 births
Actors from Nagasaki Prefecture
Japanese idols
Japanese film actresses
Japanese television actresses
Japanese female adult models
Living people
People from Nagasaki
Musicians from Nagasaki Prefecture
20th-century Japanese actresses
20th-century Japanese women singers
20th-century Japanese singers
21st-century Japanese actresses
21st-century Japanese women singers
21st-century Japanese singers